Ressen is a village in the municipality of Lingewaard in the province of Gelderland, the Netherlands. Part of Ressen is now a neighbourhood of Nijmegen.

History 
Ressen was first mentioned in 1150 as Rexnam. The etymology is unknown and may not be Germanic. In 1840, it was home to 200 people. In 1997, a part of Ressen was transferred to Nijmegen for the  neighbourhood. For a short period, it had the place name Ressen (Nijmegen), however it has become an integral part of the new neighbourhood.

Gallery

References 

Populated places in Gelderland
Lingewaard
Nijmegen